The Word list of the Dutch language is a spelling dictionary of the Dutch language (Dutch orthography). It is officially established by the Dutch Language Union. Because of the colour of its published form, it is better known as the Green Booklet.

Editions 

The Green Booklet is published by Sdu in the Netherlands and Lannoo in Flanders. It is available in a paper edition and on CD-ROM at a fee; the Dutch Language Union offers a free official internet version of the list. The latest edition was released on 13 October 2015.

History 
The first publication was in 1954. A revised word list was not released until 1990. The most recent publication was in 2015. Its content does not differ from the previous version published in 2005. The current spelling has been effective since August 1, 2006.

In 1994 the committee of Ministers of the Dutch Language Union decided that the wordlist of the Green Booklet will be updated every ten years. The 2005 edition was the first time that Surinamese Dutch words were included; about 500 of them were added as was agreed upon when Suriname joined the Language Union in January 2005.

The Green Booklet should not be confused with the Green dictionary, which is also a publication of Sdu.

Criticism 
The Green Booklet has been criticised in recent years because of its complicated rules such as the rules on how to use an -n between certain compound words. Opponents claim that the rules are too fuzzy and are changing too fast, causing problems in education. Teachers and pupils complain about the lack of simple rules and the many exceptions.

In December 2005 a number of major Dutch newspapers, magazines and the broadcaster NOS announced that they will boycott the latest edition of the Green Booklet. It is said to be too confusing, illogical and unworkable to be usable. Instead they will follow the spelling which is laid out in the White Booklet (Witte Boekje). In Flanders, media use the official Green Booklet-spelling.

The Yellow Book 
Although the "Green Booklet" is also the official list of words for Flemish people, they use words which are not in the Green Booklet and not known by people in The Netherlands. However, those words are so commonly used in Flanders, most people are not aware these are not official. Many of those words are even used in newspapers, magazines, and television. On 31 January 2015 De Standaard and some language professionals published the Yellow Book. In this book a word is printed in black or in grey. A black word is a non-official word, but De Standaard will allow it in their newspapers. A grey word is a non-official word which may not be used. It is the intention that other Flemish media will use the Yellow Book.

See also 
 History of Dutch orthography
 OpenTaal 
 Van Dale Great dictionary of the Dutch language, uses the official spelling since 2005.
 White Booklet, the wordlist of the Genootschap Onze Taal.

References 

Dutch Language Union

Dutch dictionaries
Spelling dictionaries
Dutch non-fiction literature